Saint Joseph's Day, also called the Feast of Saint Joseph or the Solemnity of Saint Joseph, is in Western Christianity the principal feast day of Saint Joseph, husband of the Virgin Mary and legal father of Jesus Christ, celebrated on 19 March. It has the rank of a solemnity in the Catholic Church. It is a feast or commemoration in the provinces of the Anglican Communion, and a feast or festival in the Lutheran Church. Saint Joseph's Day is the Patronal Feast day for Poland as well as for Canada, persons named Joseph, Josephine, etc., for religious institutes, schools and parishes bearing his name, and for carpenters. It is also Father's Day in some Catholic countries, mainly Spain, Portugal, and Italy. It is not a holy day of obligation for Catholics in the United States.

19 March was dedicated to Saint Joseph in several Western calendars by the 10th century, and this custom was established in Rome by 1479. Pope Pius V extended its use to the entire Roman Rite by his Apostolic Constitution Quo primum (14 July 1570). Originally a double of the second class and a feast of precept, it was re-raised to be of precept in 1917 after having this status intermittently lost, and consequently also raised to its current rank of double of the first class (now called a solemnity), having become in the meantime the rank common to all remaining general feasts of precept. Since 1969, Episcopal Conferences may, if they wish, transfer it to a date outside Lent. Even if it occurs inside Lent on the usual date of 19 March, it is still observed as a Solemnity of a Saint—this is one of the few times during Lent the Gloria may be said or sung, the vesture is changed from the purple or violet of Lent to white or gold (as it would be for such a solemnity normally), the Collect and the Eucharistic Prayer's Preface and other prayers are from the Solemnity and not Lent, the hymns are more joyful, and the Creed is said. However, the Alleluia is still not used, the Tract being used instead, per Lenten regulations.

Between 1870 and 1955, an additional feast was celebrated in honor of Saint Joseph as Spouse of the Blessed Virgin Mary and Patron of the Universal Church, the latter title having been given to him by Pope Pius IX. Originally celebrated on the third Sunday after Easter with an octave, after Divino Afflatu of Saint Pius X (see Reform of the Roman Breviary by Pope Pius X), it was moved to the preceding Wednesday (because Wednesday was the day of the week specifically dedicated to St. Joseph, St. John the Baptist and local patrons). The feast was also retitled The Solemnity of Saint Joseph. This celebration and its accompanying octave were abolished during the modernisation and simplification of rubrics under Pope Pius XII in 1955.

At the same time, Pope Pius XII established an additional Feast of "St. Joseph the Worker", to be celebrated on 1 May, in order to coincide with the celebration of International Workers' Day (May Day) in many countries.  Until this time, 1 May had been the Feast of the Apostles Saint Philip and James, but that Feast was then moved to the next free day, 11 May (and again to 3 May, in 1969, having become free in the meantime).  In the new calendar published in 1969, the Feast of Saint Joseph The Worker, which at one time occupied the highest possible rank in the Church calendar, was reduced to an optional Memorial, the lowest rank for a saint's day.

The Eastern Orthodox Church celebrates Saint Joseph on the Sunday after Christmas.

Popular customs among Christians of various liturgical traditions observing Saint Joseph's Day are attending Mass or the Divine Service, wearing red-coloured clothing, carrying dried fava beans that have been blessed, and assembling home altars dedicated to Saint Joseph.

Christian traditions

March 19 always falls during Lent, a season traditionally marked by fast and abstinence. Saint Joseph's day, however, is a solemnity and per the 1983 Code of Canon Law overrides Friday obligations in the Catholic Church. Previously, per the 1917 Code of Canon Law, the obligation of fasting and abstinence was not dispensed on St. Joseph's Day even where it was kept as a Holy Day of Obligation: "On [Sundays] or feasts of precept, the law of abstinence or of abstinence and fast or of fast only ceases, except during Lent, nor is the vigil anticipated; likewise it ceases on Holy [Saturday] afternoon" (1917 Code, Canon 1252 § 4).

If the feast day falls on a Sunday other than Palm Sunday, it is observed on the next available day, usually Monday, 20 March, unless another solemnity (e.g., a church's patronal saint) falls on that day. Since 2008, if Saint Joseph's Day falls during Holy Week, it is moved to the closest possible day before 19 March, usually the Saturday before Holy Week. This change was announced by the Congregation for Divine Worship in Notitiae in order to avoid occurrences of the feasts of Saint Joseph and the Annunciation both being moved to just after the Easter octave. This decision does not apply to those using the 1962 Missal according to the provisions of Summorum Pontificum; when that missal is used, its particular rubrics, which require the feast to be transferred to the next available date after 19 March, must be observed. In practice, the 1962 rubrics lead to the observance of St. Joseph's Day on the Tuesday following the Second Sunday of Easter, as the Feast of the Annunciation (which must also be transferred in years when its assigned date, 25 March, falls during either Holy Week or the octave of Easter) is observed on the Monday after the Second Sunday of Easter.

Italy
In Sicily, where Saint Joseph is regarded by many as their patron saint, and in many Italian-American communities, thanks are given to Saint Joseph (San Giuseppe in Italian). Giving food to the needy is a Saint Joseph's Day custom. In some communities it is traditional to wear red clothing and eat a Neapolitan pastry known as a zeppola (created in 1840 by Don Pasquale Pinatauro in Napoli) on Saint Joseph's Day. Maccu di San Giuseppe is a traditional Sicilian dish that consists of various ingredients and maccu that is prepared on this day. Maccu is a foodstuff and soup that dates to ancient times which is prepared with fava beans as a primary ingredient.

One prominent custom is the Saint Joseph's day altar, which has spread from Sicily to the United States in the 1800s. These altars are typically elaborate; being decorated with figurines, medals, and votive candles. The Saint Joseph's day altar is into three sections representing the three persons of the Trinity, and has a statue of Joseph at its head. The tables are dressed with food, which are donated to the poor on the solemnity. Upon a typical Saint Joseph's Day altar, people place flowers, limes, candles, wine, fava beans, specially prepared cakes, breads, and cookies (as well as other meatless dishes), and zeppole. Foods are traditionally served containing bread crumbs to represent saw dust since Joseph was a carpenter. Because the feast occurs during Lent, traditionally no meat was allowed on the celebration table. The altar usually has three tiers, to represent the Trinity.

According to legend, Saint Joseph interceded to relieve a famine in Sicily during the Middle Ages. There was a severe drought at the time, and the people prayed for their patron saint to bring them rain. They promised that if God answered their prayers through Joseph's intercession, they would prepare a large feast to honor him. The rain did come, and the people of Sicily prepared a large banquet for their patron saint. The fava bean was the crop which saved the population from starvation and is a traditional part of Saint Joseph's Day altars and traditions. On the Sicilian island of Lipari, the Saint Joseph legend is modified somewhat, and says that sailors returning from the mainland encountered a fierce storm that threatened to sink their boat.  They prayed to Saint Joseph for deliverance, and when they were saved, they swore to honor the saint each year on his feast day.

Some villages like Avola used to burn wood and logs in squares on the day before Saint Joseph, as thanksgiving to the Saint. In Belmonte Mezzagno this is currently still performed every year, while people  ritually  shout invocations to the Saint in local Sicilian language. This is called "A Vampa di San Giuseppe" (the Saint Joseph's bonfire).

Spectacular celebrations are also held in Bagheria. Joseph is even celebrated twice a year, the second time being held especially for people from Bagheria who come back for summer vacation from other parts of Italy or abroad.

In Italy, 19 March is also Father's Day.

Malta
In Malta, the set date for the celebration of Saint Joseph is 19 March, but can be moved if necessary to fit into the Lent and Easter season. This has been a day of remembrance in Malta since the 10th century A.D. Most businesses shut down for this day for all the celebrations that occur. The main celebrations are held in Mdina, which is the "old capital" of Malta in the suburbs of the city of Rabat. There are three main events that occur for this day. One of them being special masses in honor of Saint Joseph. Then it follows with colorful processions with music bands in the streets and fireworks at night. The main procession takes place in the evening with the statue of Saint Joseph being carried to the church of Saint Mary of Jesus. The statue represents a high level of workmanship for the figure Joseph had in Jesus' life. Also, this is one of the public holidays in Malta, known as Jum San Ġużepp. People celebrate mass in the morning, and in the afternoon go for a picnic. It is a liturgical feast that occurs on a Sunday in summer. However, the city of Rabat celebrates the traditional Maltese feast where in the evening a procession is also held with the statue of Saint Joseph. On this day also the city of Żejtun celebrates the day, known as Jum il-Kunsill (Zejtun Council's Day), till 2013 was known as Jum iż-Żejtun (Zejtun's Day). During this day a prominent person from Żejtun is given the Żejtun Honour (Ġieħ iż-Żejtun). In the past years the Żejtun Parish Church has celebrated these feast days with a procession with the statue of Saint Joseph.

Spain

In Spain, Saint Joseph's Day is their version of Father's Day, which is called El Dia del Padre. In some parts of Spain it is celebrated as Falles. They feel that Saint Joseph is a good example of what a father figure should be like, which is why they connect these two days. Since Spain does correlate this day with Father's Day, it is tradition for children to cook their fathers breakfast or even give small gifts. It is a "meatless affair", because it occurs during the Lenten season. Some symbols to represent this day include Jesus holding carpenter tools, baby Jesus, and a staff with lilies. A few things to do on this day to celebrate are attending a special church service, visiting different cathedrals, joining Valencia's Falla Festival, and exploring the city, museums and art galleries. The Falla Festival runs for 5 days and ends on 19 March in remembrance of Saint Joseph.

Poland
Polish families celebrate this day with a Saint Joseph's table in their house that is decorated with red and white for Poland and Saint Joseph. These tables set up in their house include holy cards and candles all around and meatless food in which they call a "festive fast" because it is Lent season. To represent and honor Saint Joseph, Poland has hymns they made. A few of the hymns are Duszo moja, O Jozefie Ukochany, and Szczesliwy, Kto Sobie Patrona.

Philippines
In the Philippines, especially in rice producing provinces like Iloilo, some families maintain the ritual of holding a banquet for the Holy Family. An old man, a young lady, and a small boy, often chosen from among the poor, are honoured as representations of Saint Joseph, the Blessed Virgin Mary, and the Child Jesus, respectively. The three, sometimes dressed like the santo (traditional saint image) they each represent, are seated around a table set with the family's best silverware and china, and served a variety of courses. Hymns are sung while they are literally spoonfed by senior members of the host family and important guests. The Novena to Saint Joseph is also recited at a nearby temporary altar. The hosts and other participants then seek blessings from the "Holy Family" by paying obeisance to the three individuals (or images of the holy personages they represent), either through kissing icons in the hands of the trio or performing mano, all while genuflecting before them. The now-fed "Holy Family" are lastly given donations (monetary or in kind), which they split amongst themselves, as a thank-you gift after the ceremony.

United States

In New Orleans, Louisiana, which was a major port of entry for Sicilian immigrants during the late 19th century, the Feast of Saint Joseph is a citywide event. Both public and private Saint Joseph's altars are traditionally built, especially in and around the Lake Vista neighborhood. The altars are usually open to any visitor who wishes to pay homage. The food is generally distributed to charity after the altar is dismantled. Saint Joseph's altars can be found in churches and public spaces throughout southeast Louisiana during this season.

There are also parades in honor of Saint Joseph and the Italian population of New Orleans which are similar to the many marching clubs and truck parades of Mardi Gras and Saint Patrick's Day. Tradition in New Orleans also holds that by burying a small statue of Saint Joseph upside down in the front yard of a house, that house will sell more promptly. In addition to the above traditions, some groups of Mardi Gras Indians stage their last procession of the season on the Sunday nearest to Saint Joseph's Day otherwise known as "Super Sunday," after which their costumes are dismantled.

Saint Joseph's Day is also celebrated in other American communities with high proportions of Italians such as New York City; Utica, NY; Syracuse, NY; Niagara Falls, NY; Rochester, NY; Buffalo, NY; Hawthorne, NJ; Hoboken, NJ; Jersey City, NJ; Kansas City, MO; Chicago, IL Gloucester, Mass.; Hartford, Connecticut; and Providence, Rhode Island, where observance (which takes place just after Saint Patrick's Day) often is expressed through "the wearing of the red", i.e., wearing red clothing or accessories similar to the wearing of green on Saint Patrick's Day. Saint Joseph's Day tables may also be found in Rockford and Elmwood Park, Illinois.

Americans of Polish ancestry, especially those in the Midwest and New England, who have the name Joseph celebrate Saint Joseph's Day (Dzien Swietego Jozefa) as an imieniny. As a symbol of ethnic pride, and in solidarity with their Italian counterparts, Polish Catholic parishes often hold Saint Joseph's Day feasts known as Saint Joseph's Tables or Saint Joseph's altars, and display statues and holy cards of Saint Joseph. As the day falls during Lent, these are meatless feasts.

In the Mid-Atlantic regions, Saint Joseph's Day is traditionally associated with the return of anadromous fish, such as striped bass, to their natal rivers, such as the Delaware.

Saint Joseph's Day is also the day when the swallows are traditionally believed to return to Mission San Juan Capistrano after having flown south for the winter.

Canada
Saint Joseph is the patron saint of Canada. Saint Joseph's Oratory in Montreal hosts a novena and special masses to celebrate the feast of Saint Joseph. These events draw thousands of pilgrims to the basilica.

England 
Joseph of Nazareth is remembered in the Church of England with a Festival on 19 March.

See also

 Calendar of saints

References

External links

 Catholic Church Calendar
 Anglican Calendar 
 Saint Joseph's Day Altars
 Prayer to Saint Joseph
 Saint Joseph's Day – Fathers Day

Saint Josephs Day
Public holidays in Liechtenstein
Italian-American culture
March observances
Joseph
Labor monuments and memorials
Saint Joseph (husband of Mary)
Father's Day
Anglican saints